Prorhynchops is a genus of parasitic flies in the family Tachinidae. There are at least two described species in Prorhynchops.

Species
Prorhynchops bilimeki Brauer & von Bergenstamm, 1891
Prorhynchops errans Curran, 1927

References

Dexiinae
Diptera of North America
Tachinidae genera
Taxa named by Friedrich Moritz Brauer
Taxa named by Julius von Bergenstamm